Henri-Joseph Dugué de La Fauconnerie (1835-1914) was a French politician. He served as a member of the Corps législatif from 1869 to 1870, and as a member of the Chamber of Deputies from 1876 to 1881, and from 1885 to 1893, representing Orne.

Publications 
1859: Le Tribunal de la Rote 
1861: La Bretagne et l'empire
1885: Notre pauvre Argent !
1912: Souvenirs d'un vieil homme: (1866–1879)

Sources

References 

1835 births
1914 deaths
Politicians from Paris
Appel au peuple
Members of the 4th Corps législatif of the Second French Empire
Members of the 1st Chamber of Deputies of the French Third Republic
Members of the 2nd Chamber of Deputies of the French Third Republic
Members of the 4th Chamber of Deputies of the French Third Republic
Members of the 5th Chamber of Deputies of the French Third Republic
Officers of the Order of Saints Maurice and Lazarus
Chevaliers of the Légion d'honneur